Red Lerille (born Lloyd Lerille in 1936) is a New Orleans native and the winner of numerous bodybuilding titles, including Mr. New Orleans in 1955, Mr. Armed Forces and Mr. Hawaii in 1958, Mr. Dixie  in 1959, and AAU Mr. America which he won in 1960. 
Red served in the United States Navy from 1955 - 1959.
Lerille graduated from the University of Southwestern Louisiana (Now University of Louisiana Lafayette) in 1987 with a bachelor of general studies.

Lerille worked at Mike Stansbury's Health Club, Inc. in Lafayette, Louisiana.
He opened his fitness club Red's in Lafayette, Louisiana on January 13, 1963. In 1965 the club moved to its current location on Doucet Road. Lerille is a collector of high wheel bicycles and antique airplanes.

He is the recipient of the 2011 Club Industry Lifetime Achievement Award  and received University of Louisiana at Lafayette Alumni Association's Outstanding Alumni Award in 2002. In 2011 he was the UL Lafayette Alumni Association's Spring Gala honoree in recognition of his community service and support of the university

References

External links
 Redlerilles.com

1936 births
American bodybuilders
Living people
People associated with physical culture